Dota is a series of strategy video games by Valve.

Dota may also refer to:

Arts and entertainment
Dota (singer), German singer-songwriter
"Vi sitter i Ventrilo och spelar DotA", a song by Basshunter
 "DotA", 2007 single version
 "DotA", 2008 Now You're Gone – The Album version

Geography
Dota (canton), a canton in the province of San José, Costa Rica

Medicine
The Declaration of the Americas on Diabetes (DOTA 1996).  This is one of several regional declarations co-sponsored by the World Health Organization and the International Diabetes Federation, the first being the St. Vincent Declaration (WHO EURO 1989).  
DOTA (chelator), a chemical
DOTA-TATE, a substance used in cancer treatment
90Y-DOTA-biotin, another substance used in cancer treatment

Video games
Defense of the Ancients (DotA), a mod for the video game Warcraft III: Reign of Chaos
Dota 2, a standalone sequel to DotA
Dota Underlords, a strategy game spin-off to Dota 2

Television
Dota: Dragon's Blood, American animated show